Shane Bond may refer to:

 Shane Bond (born 1975), retired New Zealand cricketer
 Shane K. Bond (born 1954), former Australian rules footballer
 Shane Bond (footballer born 1975), former Australian rules footballer